The 1928 United States presidential election in Delaware took place on November 6, 1928. All contemporary 48 states were part of the 1928 United States presidential election. State voters chose three electors to the Electoral College, which selected the president and vice president. 

Delaware was won by Republican Secretary of Commerce Herbert Hoover of California, who was running against Democratic Governor of New York Alfred E. Smith. Hoover's running mate was Senate Majority Leader Charles Curtis of Kansas, while Smith's running mate was Senator Joseph Taylor Robinson of Arkansas. 

Hoover won with a majority of 65.03% of the vote to Smith's 34.60%, a margin of 30.43%. Socialist candidate Norman Thomas finished a distant third, with 0.31%. Hoover’s performance is the best by any presidential candidate in Delaware, surpassing its nearest rival from Barack Obama in 2008 by 3.12%.

Results

See also
 United States presidential elections in Delaware
 Presidency of Herbert Hoover

References

Delaware
1928
1928 Delaware elections